The Aachtopf is Germany's biggest karst spring, south of the western end of the Swabian Jura near the town of Aach. It produces an average of 8,500 litres per second. The cave system has been explored since the 1960s, but as of 2020 only a small part has been discovered due to a large blockage after a few hundred metres.

Etymology
The name Aachtopf is compounded from Aach (meaning "water" in Old High German); Topf can be translated as "bowl" and is commonly used for round, bowl-shaped springs.

Geography
The Aachtopf is a karst spring, south of the western end of the Swabian Jura near the town of Aach. The spring is the source of the river Radolfzeller Aach, which flows southward into Lake Constance, and empties into the Rhine.

Origin
The spring marks the southern end of a cave system that transports water from the western end of the Swabian Jura. It produces an average of 8,500 litres per second. Production varies seasonally and in response to the weather, but the spring never runs dry. Most of the water is derived from the Danube where it disappears underground at the Donauversickerung (Danube Sinkhole) near Immendingen and Fridingen. The Rhine's steeper gradient on its much shorter route to the North Sea creates stronger headward erosion than that of the much older River Danube (see the  Danube upper river geology). This stream capture of the upper Danube and its surface tributaries is expected to cause the long-term disappearance of the Danube drainage entirely in favour of the Rhine.

The Danube flows eastwards into the Black Sea, whereas the Rhine flows northwards to the North Sea. Therefore, the water of the Aach flows under the European watershed. This is a relatively common feature of karst stream captures.

The karst spring is connected to a huge cave, which runs northwards. The cave is completely water-filled and can only be explored by cave divers.

History of exploration
In 1719, F. W. Bräuninger published his hypothesis that the water of the spring originated from the Danube. 
On 9 October 1877, the geologist Adolf Knop from Karlsruhe Technical College laced the water in the Danube basin with 10 kg sodium fluorescein, 20 zentner (1000 kg) of salt and 1200 kg of shale oil. After 60 hours he was able to detect all three substances in the spring, as evidenced by "splendidly green, salt water with a distinct creosote taste".

In 1960, the first exploration of the cave was made by Jochen Hasenmayer, a famous German cave diver.  from the spring the syphon opens into a cavern, the "Seenhalle" (Lake Hall). A collapse blocks the cave after . The cave is expected to continue for several kilometres on the other side of the blockage. 

In 1990, a local caving club was formed to find the lost cave segment towards the Danube basin by digging a shaft behind the collapse at the bottom of a large sink hole. The group has published maps of the "Donauhöhle".

As of 2020, exploration is ongoing and the continuation of the cave has not been discovered.

Fauna
In 2015, the only known cavefish in Europe, a Barbatula loach,  was discovered in the Danube–Aachtopf system.

References

External links

 Aachtopf showcaves.com.
 15 min
 6 min

 43 min

Springs of Germany
Karst springs
Karst formations of Germany
Landforms of Baden-Württemberg
Caves of Germany
SAachtopf
SAachtopf
Geography of Hegau